Petra Biondina Volpe (born 6 August 1970) is a Swiss screenwriter and film director. She is best known for directing The Divine Order.

References

External links 

1970 births
Living people
Swiss film directors
Swiss screenwriters